

Antelope Wells is a small unincorporated community in Hidalgo County, New Mexico, United States. The community is located along the Mexico-United States border, in the New Mexico Bootheel region, located across the border from the small settlement of El Berrendo, Chihuahua, Mexico. Despite its name, there are neither antelope nor wells in the area. The only inhabitants of the community are U.S. Customs and Border Protection employees.

Antelope Wells is the southernmost settlement of New Mexico, situated in the region commonly known as the Bootheel of New Mexico. It is the smallest and least-used border crossing of the 43 ports of entry along the border with Mexico. The crossing, which is open solely for non-commercial traffic, is open every day from 10:00 AM to 4:00 PM.

The port was established by Ulysses S. Grant in 1872 and has been staffed since 1928. In 1981, the community had a population of two, living in trailers behind the customs station, and averaged three people entering per day. In 2005, 93 pedestrians crossed over the border in the community, which consisted of just four buildings: the port of entry building, two houses and a trailer. Including domestic and international travelers, fewer than 500 buses and privately owned vehicles pass through the community each month, though traffic has been increasing as of 2006 with more international shuttle van service. Despite its low usage, there is no move to close the port, which is the only port between Douglas, Arizona, and Columbus, New Mexico, and provides the most direct route from the United States to the Sierra Madre Occidental.

Recreation 

Antelope Wells is located on New Mexico State Road 81, which links it with Interstate 10 and New Mexico State Road 9.

Climate

According to the Köppen Climate Classification system, Antelope Wells has a cold semi-arid climate, abbreviated "BSk" on climate maps.

See also
Antelope Wells Port of Entry

Notes

External links
Map of port of entry on the New Mexico Border Authority website

New Mexico Bootheel
Unincorporated communities in New Mexico
Populated places established in 1872
Unincorporated communities in Hidalgo County, New Mexico
1872 establishments in New Mexico Territory